Hakim Mouzaki (born 29 March 1983 in Casablanca) is a Moroccan footballer. He currently plays for Wydad Casablanca.

References

External links
 Hakim Mouzaki - goalzz.com
 Mountakhab.net - Fiches de joueurs: Hakim Mouzaki

1983 births
Living people
Footballers from Casablanca
Moroccan footballers
Wydad AC players
Association football goalkeepers